Gabriel Beauchesne-Sévigny aka OAG - Olympic Athlete Gabriel  (born December 11, 1984, in Montreal) is a Canadian sprint canoeist who has competed since the late 2000s. At the 2008 Summer Olympics in Beijing, he finished fifth in the C-2 500 m event and sixth in the C-2 1000 m event.

He is a brother of Geneviève Beauchesne-Sévigny.

References
 

1984 births
Canoeists from Montreal
Canadian male canoeists
Canoeists at the 2008 Summer Olympics
Canoeists at the 2011 Pan American Games
Canoeists at the 2015 Pan American Games
Living people
Olympic canoeists of Canada
Pan American Games gold medalists for Canada
Pan American Games medalists in canoeing
Medalists at the 2015 Pan American Games